Jon Rønningen (born November 28, 1962, in Oslo) is a former Norwegian wrestler and a member of Kolbotn IL (one of the largest sports clubs in Norway).  He won a total of 9 medals in international championships and was the third Norwegian to win two individual Summer Olympic gold medals (1988 Olympics in Seoul, Korea and 1992 Olympics in Barcelona, Spain). His brother Lars Rønningen was also a highly accomplished wrestler.

In his 2017 book Hode i klemme (lit. In a headlock), Rønningen revealed that he has struggled with depression all through his life, and has attempted suicide.

References

 Profile at FILA Wrestling Database
 sportsjournalister
 

1962 births
Living people
Olympic wrestlers of Norway
Wrestlers at the 1984 Summer Olympics
Wrestlers at the 1988 Summer Olympics
Wrestlers at the 1992 Summer Olympics
Wrestlers at the 1996 Summer Olympics
Norwegian male sport wrestlers
Olympic gold medalists for Norway
Sportspeople from Oslo
Olympic medalists in wrestling
Medalists at the 1992 Summer Olympics
Medalists at the 1988 Summer Olympics
20th-century Norwegian people
21st-century Norwegian people